TV3CAT was, until 29 May 2009, named Televisió de Catalunya Internacional. It was the international channel of Catalonia,  Televisió de Catalunya. It is part of Corporació Catalana de Mitjans Audiovisuals (CCMA). That channel was beaming to Europe through Astra satellite and America through Hispasat satellite. TV3CAT belonged to a group of channels where it was found programs from TV3, El 33, Super3, Esport3 and 3/24.

It started to beam, Sunday 10 of September 1995. Since 1 May 2012, it stopped broadcasting on satellite television due to political financial cuts. The station claims it will be continue broadcasting via the internet and through cable and ADSL in Spain.

References

External links
Official Website

Televisió de Catalunya
Catalan-language television stations
Television stations in Catalonia
Television channels and stations established in 1995
1995 establishments in Catalonia
International broadcasters